Drakino (Traka) is a rural locality (selo) in Torbeyevsky District of the Republic of Mordovia, Russia, located on the Arziponer River (Partsa's tributary) some  west of the Mordovia's capital Saransk, and  south of Torbeyevo.  Postal code: 431048. Telephone code: +7 834-56.

Mordvins (Erzya) account for the majority of the population of Drakino.  The Erzya living on the territories of Torbeyevsky (where Drakino is located) and Tengushevsky Districts are also known as "Shoksha".

Drakino was first mentioned in chronicles in 1669.

Pokrov Monastery
The parish of the Drakino The Protection of the Mother of God church was transformed into a male monastery by the Decree of the Holy Synod of the Russian Orthodox Church on February 26, 1998.  Hegumen Pakhomy, née Serafim Kutsyn, has been serving as the monastery's deputy since that time.   As of 2008, the monastery houses five novices.

References and external links

Богословский П. П. "Село Дракино Спасского уезда, Тамб. губ." "Тамбовские епархиальные ведомости", 1890, № 18, с. 924—948 
Лузгин А. С., Юшкин Ю. Ф. "Торбеево". — Саранск.: Мордов. кн. нзд-во, 1988. — 160 с. 
Website of Drakino Secondary School 

Rural localities in Mordovia
Torbeyevsky District
Spassky Uyezd (Tambov Governorate)